This is a list of presidents of the Central Bank of Argentina. The presidents and ministers of economy are listed for context, but the Central Bank has usually been an autarkic institution, except during military governments. As such, many presidents stay in the Central Bank across different presidencies, even of different political parties.

List of presidents

References

External links
 Banco Central de la República Argentina

Economic history of Argentina
 list
Argentina politics-related lists
Argentina